Typhoon Guchol, known in the Philippines as Typhoon Butchoy, was a powerful tropical cyclone which impacted Southern Japan in June 2012. The storm formed as tropical disturbance south-southeast of Pohnpei on June 7, and was upgraded to a tropical depression on June 10. The system later intensified in favorable conditions, and reached typhoon intensity on June 15. It reached peak intensity late on June 17, before making landfall over Japan as a typhoon on June 19. The system became extratropical shortly after traversing Japan and was last noted by the Japan Meteorological Agency on June 20.

Authorities issued evacuation orders for more than 150,000 people in central, eastern and northeastern Japan, Kyodo News said, with warnings of dangerous landslides from the heavy rain. Heavy rains and strong winds affected much of Honshu as the storm moved across the region. One person was killed and fifty-two others were injured across the country.

Guchol, was the first tropical storm to make a landfall in Japan in 2012, and the first since 2004 to do so as early as June. The name "Guchol"  means "turmeric" in a Micronesian language.

Meteorological history

Late on June 7, a tropical disturbance formed south-southeast of Pohnpei. Late on June 8, the Joint Typhoon Warning Center (JTWC) issued a Tropical Cyclone Formation Alert on that system but canceled it late on June 9. The Japan Meteorological Agency (JMA) upgraded the low-pressure area to a tropical depression on June 10, so did the JTWC early on June 11. Early on the next day, the JTWC upgraded the system to a tropical storm, and later the JMA also upgraded it to a tropical storm and named it Guchol. Early on June 14, the JMA upgraded Guchol to a severe tropical storm, and the Philippine Atmospheric, Geophysical and Astronomical Services Administration (PAGASA) assigned the local name Butchoy on it as the system entered the Philippine Area of Responsibility.  Later that day, the JTWC upgraded Guchol to a category 1 typhoon, as convection started to organize. It continued to intensify into a category 2 typhoon on June 15, as it became better organized and started to develop more convection.

As Guchol went through rapid intensification with a well defined eye on June 16, the JMA upgraded it to a typhoon early that day, and the JTWC upgraded it further to a category 3 typhoon, and later a category 4 super typhoon. Guchol reached peak intensity late on June 17 before it began to undergo an eyewall replacement cycle as the storm began to weaken under moderate vertical wind shear on June 18, and later started its extratropical transition. The JTWC downgraded Guchol to a tropical storm on June 19, as it made landfall over Kii Peninsula in Japan. Later that day, the JMA downgraded Guchol to a severe tropical storm, as it moves over Japan. On June 20, the JMA issued their last advisories on Guchol, as it fully transitioned into an extratropical cyclone northeast of Japan.

Preparations and impact 
Although Typhoon Guchol remained away from the Philippines, its slow movement enhance the southwest monsoon over the country and resulted in widespread heavy rain. The effects of these rains were relatively limited though, with only 310 people notable affected by the storm. Isolated flooding took place across the country, with no major damage reported. However, one person drowned in Rizal.

 At least two people were killed and eighty others were injured across the country. Total economic losses were estimated in excess of ¥8 billion (US$100 million).

See also

Typhoon Man-yi (2013)
Tropical Storm Talas (2011)

References

External links

JMA General Information of Typhoon Guchol (1204) from Digital Typhoon
JMA Best Track Data of Typhoon Guchol (1204) 
JTWC Best Track Data of Super Typhoon 05W (Guchol)
05W.GUCHOL from the U.S. Naval Research Laboratory

2012 Pacific typhoon season
2012 in Japan
Typhoons
Typhoons in Japan
2012 disasters in the Philippines
2012 in the Philippines
Typhoons in the Philippines
Guchol